A business school is a university-level institution that confers degrees in business administration or management. A business school may also be referred to as school of management, management school, school of business administration, or colloquially b-school or biz school. A business school teaches topics such as accounting, administration, business analytics, strategy, economics, entrepreneurship, finance, human resource management, management science, management information systems, international business, logistics, marketing, sales, operations management, organizational psychology, organizational behavior, public relations, research methods, real estate, and supply chain management among others.

Types
There are several forms of business schools, including a school of business, business administration, and management.
 Most of the university business schools consist of faculties, colleges, or departments within the university, and predominantly teach business courses (e.g. Mannheim Business School).
 In North America, a business school is often understood to be a university program that offers a graduate Master of Business Administration degrees and/or undergraduate bachelor's degrees (e.g. Stanford Graduate School of Business, Harvard Business School, University of Chicago Booth School of Business, Wharton School of the University of Pennsylvania).
 In Europe and Asia, some universities teach predominantly business courses (e.g. Copenhagen Business School).
 Privately owned business school which is not affiliated with any university (e.g. WHU – Otto Beisheim School of Management, Frankfurt School of Finance & Management).
 In France, many business schools are public-private partnerships (École consulaire or EESC) largely financed by the public Chambers of Commerce. These schools offer accredited undergraduate and graduate degrees in business from the elite Conférence des Grandes Écoles and have only loose ties, or no ties at all, to any university (e.g., HEC Paris, TBS Education, ESCP Business School).

Kaplan classifies business schools along four Corners:
 Culture (Europe - US): Independent of their actual (physical) location, business schools can be classified according to whether they follow the European or the US model. 
 Compass (international/global – regional/local): Business schools can be classified along a continuum, with international/ global schools on one end and regional/ local schools on the other.
 Capital (public – private): Business schools can either be publicly (state) funded or privately funded, for example through endowments or tuition fees. 
 Content (teaching – research): Business school can be classified according to whether a school considers teaching or research to be its primary focus.

Notable firsts
The first business schools appeared in Europe in the eighteenth century and multiplied from the beginning of the nineteenth century.
 1759 – The Aula do Comércio in Lisbon was the first institution to specialise in the teaching of accounting in the world. It provided a model for development of similar government-sponsored schools across Europe, and closed in 1844. Therefore, the Aula do Comércio paved the way for business schools to start.
 1819 – The oldest business school still in existence today, ESCP Business School, established as Ecole Supérieure de Commerce de Paris, is in Paris, France. Initially, ESCP was a private school that became a family firm from 1830 to 1869. ESCP Business School was established by a group of academics, economics and businessmen amongst which Jean-Baptiste Say who was an alumnus of the Grande Ecole CNAM: French National Conservatory of Arts and Crafts in Paris and faculty at both CNAM and the Collège de France, along with the banker Vital Roux.
 1855 – The Institut Supérieur de Commerce d'Anvers (State funded) and the Institut Saint-Ignace – École Spéciale de Commerce et d'Industrie (Jesuits education) were founded in the same year in the city of Antwerp, Belgium. After getting university status in 1965 and after almost 150 years of business education and rivalry between each other, both merged in 2003 into what became the University of Antwerp.
 1857 – The world's first public business school, Budapest Business School was founded in Budapest in Austria-Hungary as the first business school in Central Europe.
 1868 – The Ca' Foscari University was founded in Venice. It is the oldest business school in Italy and one of the oldest in the world.
 1881 – The Wharton School of the University of Pennsylvania is the United States' first business school. HEC Paris (The École des Hautes Études Commerciales de Paris) was established by the Paris Chamber of Commerce (CCIP).
 1898 – The University of Chicago Booth School of Business is set up in 1898 when university faculty member James Laurence Laughlin chartered the College of Commerce and Politics. On the west coast Haas School of Business is established as the College of Commerce of the University of California with Carl Copping Plehn as the Dean in 1898 and became the first public business school.
 1898 – Handelshochschule Leipzig, today Leipzig Graduate School of Management, was founded as the first Business School in Germany, so it is the oldest university teaching economics in German speaking regions.
 1898 – The University of St. Gallen established the first university in Switzerland teaching business and economics.
 1900 – The first graduate school of business in the United States, the Tuck School of Business at Dartmouth College, was founded. The school conferred the first advanced degree in business, specifically, a Master of Science in Commercial Sciences, the predecessor to the MBA.
 1902 – The Birmingham Business School of University of Birmingham is the United Kingdom's first business school. Established as the School of Commerce in Birmingham, United Kingdom.
 1903 – TBS Education, established as the École Supérieure de Commerce de Toulouse or Toulouse Business School, founded by the Toulouse Chamber of Commerce and Industry, is a triple crown grande école in France which helped re-establish the Université de Toulouse. The Solvay Brussels School of Economics and Management of Université Libre de Bruxelles is the Belgium's first business school created by an entrepreneur Ernest Solvay, founder of the chemistry company Solvay.
 1906 – The Department of Commerce was founded as part of McGill University in Montreal, Quebec, Canada, eventually developing into the Desautels Faculty of Management.
 1906 – The Warsaw School of Economics (SGH) was established as the first university in Poland dedicated to teaching commerce and economics.
 1907 – HEC Montréal is founded in Montreal, being the first School of Management of its kind in Canada. It was also the first school in North America to be awarded the 3 most prestigious accreditations (AACSB, AMBA, EQUIS), which less than 70 schools in the world have achieved.
 1907 – ESSEC Business School in Paris, which was later the first Business School outside North America to be accredited by the AACSB (main and most famous association to accredit schools of business) in 1997
 1908 – Harvard Business School was founded at Harvard University. It was the first program in the world to offer the Master of Business Administration degree.
 1909 – Stockholm School of Economics was founded on the initiative of the Swedish business sector and is the oldest business school in Sweden. Hanken School of Economics was established the same year in Helsinki, Finland.
 1914 – MIT Sloan School of Management was founded in MIT (as Course XV - Engineering Administration)
 1919 – Babson College was the first business school founded to focus solely on entrepreneurship. Every graduate receives a Bachelor of Science in Business Administration.
 1920 – First doctoral program in business was offered at The University of Chicago Booth School of Business
 1925 – Stanford Graduate School of Business was founded when trustee and eventual 31st President of the United States Herbert Hoover formed a committee focused on keeping the brightest minds in business on the west coast.
 1936 – The Norwegian School of Economics (also known as NHH) is the oldest business school in Norway.
 1946 – The Thunderbird School of Global Management, then called the American Institute for Foreign Trade, was the first graduate management school focused exclusively on global business.
 1949 – The University of Pretoria in South Africa founded the oldest business school in Africa. In January 2008 the Graduate School of Management was formally replaced by the Gordon Institute of Business Science.
1949 – XLRI – India's oldest business management school is founded.
 1953 – IISWBM is the first institute in India to offer an MBA degree.
 1957 – The McDonough School of Business at Georgetown University is founded to advance the study of business in the Jesuit tradition.
1963 – ESAN University Graduate School of Business in Lima, Peru was the first Graduate Business School founded in Latin America. It was established under an agreement between the Government of the United States of America, Stanford Graduate School of Business and the Government of Peru.
 1991 – The IEDC-Bled School of Management was the first business school to offer an MBA program in Eastern Europe.
 2019 – The  AMBA-accredited Grande Ecole Business School: INSEEC School of Business and Economics becomes the first unicorn in Higher Education in France, and becomes financially the strongest business school in France, and one of the leading groups in private Higher Education in Europe.

Degrees
In the United States, common degrees are as follows:
 Associate's degree: AA, AAB, ABA, AS
 Bachelor's Degrees: BCom, BA, BS, BBA (Bachelor of Business Administration), BBus (Bachelor of Business), BSBA, BAcc, BABA, BBS, BMOS and BBusSc (Bachelor of Business Science)
 Master's Degrees: MBA, MBM, Master of Management, MIB, MEM, MAcc, MMR, MSMR, MPA, MISM, MSM, MHA, MSF, MSc, MST, MMS, EMBA and MCom. At Oxford and Cambridge business schools an MPhil or MSc, is awarded in place of an MA.
 Doctoral Degrees: PhD, DBA, DHA, DM, Doctor of Commerce (DCOM), PhD in Management or Business Doctorate (Doctor of Philosophy), Doctor of Professional Studies (DPS)

In Europe, higher education degrees have been commonly re-organized into three levels which correspond to those of other European countries in order to facilitate international mobility: the Licence / Licence Professionnelle (Bachelor's degrees), and the Master's and Doctorat degrees. The Bachelors and the Masters are organized in semesters: 6 for the Bachelors and 4 for the Masters. A student accumulates those ECTS (European credits) which are generally transferable between paths. A Bachelors is awarded once 180 ECTS have been obtained (bac + 3); a Masters is awarded once 120 additional credits have been obtained (bac +5) . A Doctorate is awarded after a Master's and additional 180 ECTS are obtained (bac + 8), and other academic requirements are satisfied. In Francophone countries, those levels of study include various "parcours" or paths based on UE (Unités d'enseignement or Modules), each worth a defined number of ECTS. Grand école business schools are elite academic institutions that admit students through an extremely competitive process, and the highly coveted PGE (Grand Ecole Program) ends with the degree of Master's in Management (MiM).

Case studies
Some business schools structure their teaching around the use of case studies (i.e. the case method). Case studies have been used in Graduate and Undergraduate business education for nearly one hundred years. Business cases are historical descriptions of actual business situations. Typically, information is presented about a business firm's products, markets, competition, financial structure, sales volumes, management, employees and other factors influencing the firm's success. The length of a business case study may range from two or three pages to 30 pages, or more.

Business schools often obtain case studies published by the Harvard Business School, INSEAD, London Business School, the Kellogg School of Management at Northwestern University, the Ross School of Business at the University of Michigan, the Richard Ivey School of Business at The University of Western Ontario, the Darden School at the University of Virginia, IESE, other academic institutions, or case clearing houses (such as The Case Centre). Harvard's most popular case studies include Lincoln Electric Co. and Google, Inc.Students are expected to scrutinize the case study and prepare to discuss strategies and tactics that the firm should employ in the future. Three different methods have been used in business case teaching:
 Preparing case-specific questions to be answered by the student. This is used with short cases intended for Undergraduate students. The underlying concept is that such students need specific guidance to be able to analyze case studies.
 Problem-solving analysis is the second method initiated by the Harvard Business School which is by far the most widely used method in MBA and executive development programs. The underlying concept is that with enough practice (hundreds of case analyses) students develop intuitive skills for analyzing and resolving complex business situations. Successful implementation of this method depends heavily on the skills of the discussion leader.
 A generally applicable strategic planning approach. This third method does not require students to analyze hundreds of cases. A strategic planning model is provided and students are instructed to apply the steps of the model to six – and up to a dozen cases – during a semester. This is sufficient to develop their ability to analyze a complex situation, generate a variety of possible strategies and to select the best ones. In effect, students learn a generally applicable approach to analyze cases studies and real situations. This approach does not make any extraordinary demands on the artistic and dramatic talents of the teacher. Consequently, most professors are capable of supervising the application of this method.

History of business cases
When Harvard Business School started operating in 1908, the faculty realized that there were no textbooks suitable for a graduate program in business. Their first solution to this problem involved interviewing leading practitioners of business and writing detailed accounts of what these managers were doing, based partly on the case method already in use at Harvard Law School. Of course, the professors could not present these cases as practices to be emulated, because there were no criteria available for determining what would succeed and what would not succeed. So the professors instructed their students to read the cases and to come to class prepared to discuss the cases and to offer recommendations for appropriate courses of action. The basic outlines of this method still operate in business-school curricula .

Other approaches
In contrast to the case method some schools use a skills-based approach in teaching business. This approach emphasizes quantitative methods, in particular operations research, management information systems, statistics, organizational behavior, modeling and simulation, and decision science. The leading institution in this method is the Tepper School of Business at Carnegie Mellon University. The goal is to provide students a set of tools that will prepare them to tackle and solve problems.

Another important approach used in business school is the use of business games that are used in different disciplines such as business, economics, management, etc. Some colleges are blending many of these approaches throughout their degree programs, and even blending the method of delivery for each of these approaches. A study from by Inside Higher Ed and the Babson Survey Research Group shows that there is still disagreement as to the effectiveness of the approaches but the reach and accessibility is proving to be more and more appealing. Liberal arts colleges in the United States like New England College, Wesleyan University, and Bryn Mawr College are now offering complete online degrees in many business curricula despite the controversy that surrounds the learning method.

There are also several business schools which still rely on the lecture method to give students a basic business education. Lectures are generally given from the professor's point of view, and rarely require interaction from the students unless notetaking is required. Lecture as a method of teaching in business schools has been criticized by experts for reducing the incentive and individualism in the learning experience.

Executive education
In addition to teaching students, many business schools run Executive Education programs. These may be either open programs or company-specific programs. Executives may also acquire an MBA title in an Executive MBA program within university of business or from top ranked business schools. Many business schools seek close co-operation with business.

Accreditation
There are three main accreditation agencies for business schools in the United States: ACBSP, AACSB, and the IACBE. In Europe, the EQUIS business school accreditation system is run by the EFMD, which sometimes applies the more narrow EPAS label to specific courses. The AMBA accredits MBA programmes and other post-graduate business programmes in 75 countries; its sister organisation the Business Graduates Association (BGA), accredits business schools, based on the impact they make on students, employers and the wider community and society, in terms of ethics and responsible management practices. Triple accreditation is used to indicate that a school has been accredited by these three bodies: AACSB, AMBA, and EQUIS. About 1% of business schools are triple-accredited.

Global Master of Business Administration ranking
Each year, well-known business publications such as The Economist, Eduniversal, U.S. News & World Report, Fortune, Financial Times, Bloomberg Businessweek, and The Wall Street Journal'' publish rankings of select BBA and MBA programs and undergraduate business schools that, while sometimes controversial in their methodologies, nevertheless can directly influence the prestige of schools that achieve high scores. Academic research is also considered to be an important feature and popular way to gauge the prestige of business schools. Business schools share the common purpose of developing global managerial talent and to this end, business schools are encouraged to accelerate global engagement strategies on the foundations of collaboration and innovation.

Tuition 
In Europe, a bachelor's degree is tuition-free at public intuitions in several countries: Austria, Cyprus, Czech Republic, Denmark, Estonia, Finland, Germany, Greece, Malta, Montenegro, Norway, Poland, Scotland, Slovakia, Slovenia, Sweden, Turkey. In the German education system, most universities do not charge tuition, except for some executive MBA programs. French tuition fees are capped based on the level of education pursued, from 183 Euros (US $) per year for undergraduate and up to 388 Euros (US $) for doctorates. Tuition fees in the United Kingdom were introduced in 1998 and are at 9,000 GBP annually in most of the UK, except in Scotland where was tuition abolished. All private and autonomous institutions in Europe charge tuition.

In the United States, most public college and universities charge tuition. According to the CollegeBoard, the average cost for an out-of-state, or international student, to attend a public four year university in 2020 was US$38,330 ( Euros), while the average in-state cost was US$21,950 ( Euros). Two year public universities, such as a community colleges, charge US$3,730 ( Euros) on average for in-state students, but these institutions usually do not offer Bachelors or MBA degrees. Private institutions in the United States all charge tuition, often considerably more than their public counterparts.

Lists

 List of Ivy League business schools
 List of Big Ten business schools
 List of business schools in Africa
 List of business schools in Australia
 List of business schools in Asia
 List of business schools in Canada
 List of business schools in Chile
 List of business schools in Europe
 List of business schools in France
 List of business schools in Germany
 List of business schools in India
 List of business schools in South Africa
 List of business schools in Switzerland
 List of business schools in Taiwan
 List of business schools in New Zealand
 List of business schools in the United States
 List of United States graduate business school rankings

See also
 Accreditation Council for Business Schools and Programs
 Association to Advance Collegiate Schools of Business
 Association of MBAs
 Case competition
 Central and East European Management Development Association
 Decision Sciences Institute
 European Foundation for Management Development
 International Assembly for Collegiate Business Education

References

 
Management education
Types of university or college